Zhiping may refer to:

Locations in China
Zhiping, Gansu (治平镇), Jingning County, Gansu
Zhiping Town, Chongqing (支坪镇), Jiangjin District, Chongqing
Zhiping Township, Chongqing (治平乡), Chengkou County, Chongqing
Zhiping She Ethnic Township (治平畲族乡), Ninghua County, Fujian

Historical eras
Zhiping (治平, 1064–1067), era name used by Emperor Yingzong of Song
Zhiping (治平, 1351–1355), era name used by Xu Shouhui